The James Cycle Co Ltd., Greet, Birmingham, England, was one of many British cycle and motorcycle makers based in the English Midlands, particularly Birmingham. Most of their light motorcycles, often with the characteristic maroon finish, used Villiers and, later, AMC two-stroke engines.

James were prolific bicycle and motorcycle manufacturers from 1897 to 1966. The company was taken over by Associated Motor Cycles in 1951 and combined with Francis-Barnett in 1957. In 1966 the company became one of the many British motorcycle companies forced out of business by Japanese competition.

Models
James produced the 98 cc Autocycle, 125 cc Comet, Commodore, also 1954/55 Colonel 225cc Villiers single cylinder, several Captains as well as trials and scrambles bikes. In 1956 they produced the Captain 200 K7, Cotswold 200 K7C, and Commando 200 K7T, all 197 cc.

See also
List of James motorcycles

References
James Motorcycles Information Website
James Motorcycle Website - resources and manuals

 
Defunct motorcycle manufacturers of the United Kingdom
1897 establishments in England
1966 disestablishments in England
Defunct motor vehicle manufacturers of England
Defunct companies based in Birmingham, West Midlands
Manufacturing companies based in Birmingham, West Midlands
British companies disestablished in 1966
British companies established in 1897